Trimeresurus nebularis (also known as the Cameron Highlands pit viper or the clouded pit viper) is a species of pit viper found in the Cameron Highlands District of west Malaysia and Thailand.

References 

nebularis